Robert Gleed, Sr. (1836 – July 24, 1916), was an American politician, merchant, and civic leader. He served as a Republican in the Mississippi State Senate during the Reconstruction era.

Biography 
Robert Gleed, Sr. was born in 1836 into slavery in Virginia. He had remained enslaved until the end of the American Civil War, around 1865; and at one point before the end of the war he was arrested as a runaway slave in Columbus, Lowndes County, Mississippi.

Gleed was elected to Mississippi state legislature in either 1869, or 1870. In 1871, he testified for Congressional Investigators about the role of Southern newspapers, and the Ku Klux Klan in fomenting violence and resistance to Reconstruction-era efforts in Mississippi in the years after the American Civil War.

He resigned from the state senate in 1873 after the killing of seven "recalcitrant blacks". He had four children. After several of his fellow African Americans were killed before an election in 1875, he relocated to Paris, Texas. He later returned to Columbus, Mississippi, but was chased away again.

He campaigned for sheriff in Lowndes County in 1875. He met with leading Democratic Party representatives and attempted to appease them before the election. He was unsuccessful, and his home was attacked and burned as well as some of his neighbors' homes.

He died on July 24, 1916 in Harris County, Texas. Gleed is buried at Sandfield Cemetery in Columbus, Mississippi.

References

External links
 Findagrave entry

1836 births
1916 deaths
People from Lowndes County, Mississippi
Activists for African-American civil rights
African-American politicians during the Reconstruction Era
African-American state legislators in Mississippi
Republican Party Mississippi state senators
20th-century African-American people